Coast Plaza Hotel was a hotel in Vancouver, British Columbia, Canada. The hotel has 269 rooms, and was originally an apartment building but was converted into a 35-story hotel above the Denman Place Mall.

The hotel officially closed on November 30, 2017.

References

External links
Official site

Hotels in Vancouver
Hotels established in 1969
Hotel buildings completed in 1969
Hotels disestablished in 2017
1969 establishments in British Columbia
2017 disestablishments in British Columbia
Defunct hotels in Canada